Mega Aircompany was a charter airline based in Almaty, Kazakhstan.

Destinations

Baku (Heydar Aliyev International Airport)

Tbilisi (Tbilisi International Airport)

Almaty (Almaty International Airport)

Fleet
The Mega Aircompany fleet includes the following aircraft (as at February 2013):

1 Boeing 727-200

References

External links

Airlines of Kazakhstan